Miss Grand Japan is a national female beauty pageant in Japan, held annually since 2015, aiming to select the country representative for Miss Grand International, which is an annual international beauty pageant promoting World Peace and against all kinds of conflicts. The pageant has been being organized by Face Up Japan Limited, headed by Miss Grand Japan 2013 , since its establishment.

Since its first participation at Miss Grand International in 2013, Japan holds a record of 5 placements; in 2014 – 2015 and 2018 – 2020, the highest achievement is the fourth runner-up, obtained by Haruka Oda of Saitama in 2018. Japan also won the best evening gown award and the best national costume award in 2015 and 2019, respectively.

Background

History
Japan has participated in Miss Grand International since 2013. Its first two representatives were appointed by InterGo Co., Ltd., the franchise holder of Miss Grand International in Japan at that instant. The inaugural edition of Miss Grand Japan was organized after , Miss Grand Japan 2013, acquired the license in 2015. Since then, the pageant had been held annually in Greater Tokyo Area.

In 2021, the original winner, Sarina Chanana of Chiba, was forced to resign due to some documents problems, which caused the organizer to cancel all results of such an edition and hold the contest again to determine the replacement.

Edition
The following list is the edition detail of the Miss Grand Japan contest, since its inception in 2015.

Selection of contestants
In the first four editions of the Miss Grand Japan contest, the national aspirants were only selected by the national organizer through either an online application or casting event. During 2019 - 2021, in addition to the central selection, some of the national finalists were also chosen through the prefecture pageant named "The Best of Miss", which also select the regional candidates for Miss Universe Japan and Miss University. In 2019, 16 out of 33 national candidates were determined by such regional contests. However, due to the COVID-19 pandemic, the national organizer only accepted the central application for the 2022 edition.

Titleholders

National finalists
The following list is the national finalists of the Miss Grand Japan pageant, as well as the competition results.

Color keys
 Declared as the winner
 Ended as a runner-up (Top 5)
 Ended as a semifinalist (Top 10,12)
 Ended as a semifinalist (Top 20)
 Did not participate
 Withdraw during the competition

References

External links

 

Japan
Recurring events established in 2015
Grand Japan